Imede saar is a novel by Estonian author Karl Ristikivi. It was first published in 1964 in Lund, Sweden by Eesti Kirjanike Kooperatiiv (Estonian Writers' Cooperative). In Estonia it was published in 1966.

1964 novels
Novels by Karl Ristikivi